Karolis Giedraitis  (born 24 March 1998 in Vilnius, Lithuania) is a Lithuanian professional basketball player who plays for Labas Gas Prienai of the Lithuanian Basketball League.

Career 
Giedraitis started career in Lietuvos Rytas-2 (RKL) development team of BC Rytas on 2015/2016 season. Next season, he moved to BC Perlas. Karolis spent one and half season with team, and in 2019 January signeded new contract with Rytas. Soon after signing new contract, he were loaned to BC Lietkabelis

Personal life
He is the son of former professional basketball player and coach Andrius Giedraitis.

References

1998 births
Living people
BC Rytas players
Lithuanian men's basketball players
Shooting guards